Ellinor Miranda Salome Olovsdotter (born 8 October 1985), known professionally as Elliphant, is a Swedish singer, rapper and songwriter. Her sound was initially created together with the Swedish production duo Jungle, which consists of Tim Denéve and Ted Krotkiewski. The music they created together caught the attention of TEN Music Group, to which Elliphant signed in 2011. Elliphant also supported Major Lazer, the side project of American producer and DJ Diplo, on their 2015 European tour.

Life and career

Early life and career beginnings
Elliphant was born Ellinor Miranda Salome Olovsdotter in Stockholm to an Icelandic family. In 2011, Elliphant was at a party in Paris when she met producer Tim Denéve, who needed someone that could sing and help him with his demos. Six months later, she signed to TEN Music Group.

2012–2013: Elliphant and A Good Idea

Elliphant released her debut single "Tekkno Scene" in 2012. The track, which features rapper Adam Kanyama, was positively received and was featured in the video game FIFA 13. The song earned comparisons to M.I.A. and Diplo. In October 2012, Elliphant released her eponymous debut extended play on A Bigger Splash Records, including the singles "Tekkno Scene" and "Down on Life".

Following the release of her first EP, Elliphant stated in an interview with Idolator in July 2013 that she had signed to Dr. Luke's label Kemosabe Records and that her Swedish debut studio album would be titled A Good Idea. The album was released in her native Sweden on 9 October 2013, and features a number of artists and producers, including Swedish duo Niki and the Dove, who are featured on the track "More Fire".

2014–present: Look Like You Love It, One More and Living Life Golden

Elliphant released her second EP, titled Look Like You Love It, in April 2014 via Kemosabe Records and Mad Decent, featuring production from Dr. Luke, Diplo, Skrillex and Dave Sitek. It was followed by yet another EP, One More, in October, whose title track features Danish singer MØ. Elliphant was one of the opening acts on Charli XCX's Girl Power North America Tour in September and October 2014.

In early July 2015, it was announced that Elliphant's second studio album and North American debut album, Living Life Golden, would be released on 25 September by Kemosabe Records. However, it was reported in late August 2015 that the album's release had been pushed back to an unspecified date. In December 2015, it was announced that the album would be released on 25 March 2016. At the ARIA Music Awards of 2017 the Song of the Year category was won by "Stranger" featuring Elliphant. As one of the track's songwriters, Elliphant also won Dance Work of the Year and Most Played Australian Work at the APRA Music Awards of 2018.

In 2018, the song "Everybody" was featured at the end of the film The Spy Who Dumped Me. Later in 2018, a new Elliphant song "To the End" was featured in the film Spider-Man: Into the Spider-Verse, serving as the introduction music for Spider-Woman. The song was released in January 2019.

She released her third studio album Rocking Horse in April 2021, preceded by the singles "Uterus", "Had Enough", "Time Machine", "White Tiger", "Could This Be Love", "Drunk & Angry" and "Notorious".

Discography

Studio albums

Extended plays

Singles

As lead artist

As featured artist

Promotional singles

Guest appearances

Music videos

References

External links

1985 births
21st-century Swedish singers
APRA Award winners
ARIA Award winners
English-language singers from Sweden
Living people
Singers from Stockholm
Sommar (radio program) hosts
Swedish electronic musicians
Swedish pop singers
Swedish singer-songwriters
Swedish hip hop musicians
Swedish people of Icelandic descent
21st-century Swedish women singers